Szczepan Kupczak  (born 29 November 1992) is a Polish Nordic combined skier who competes internationally.

He represented Poland at the 2018 Winter Olympics.

References

External links

1992 births
Living people
Polish male Nordic combined skiers
Olympic Nordic combined skiers of Poland
Nordic combined skiers at the 2018 Winter Olympics
Nordic combined skiers at the 2022 Winter Olympics
People from Żywiec County
Universiade bronze medalists for Poland
Universiade medalists in nordic combined
Competitors at the 2013 Winter Universiade